The following is an overview of the year 2015 in Japanese literature. It includes winners of literary awards, yearly best-sellers, title debuts and endings and deaths of notable Japanese literature-related people as well as any other relevant Japanese literature-related events. For an overview of the year in literature from other countries, see 2015 in literature; for an overview of the year in manga (Japanese comics), see 2015 in manga.

Awards
 Agatha Christie Award:
 Akutagawa Prize: 
  for  
 Naoki Matayoshi for 
  for 死んでいない者
 Yukiko Motoya for 異類婚姻譚
 Bungei Prize
  for ドール
  for 地の底の記憶
 Dazai Osamu Prize:  for 変わらざる喜び
 Dengeki Novel Prize Grand Prize:
 松村涼哉 for ただ、それだけでよかったんです
 角埜杞真 for トーキョー下町ゴールドクラッシュ！
 Edogawa Rampo Prize: Katsuhiro Go for 
 Honkaku Mystery Award:
 Best Fiction:  for 
 Best Critical Work: Aoi Shimotsuki for 
 Izumi Kyōka Prize for Literature
  for 冥途あり
  for 骨風
 Japan Booksellers' Award: Nahoko Uehashi for 
 Mephisto Prize:  for 
 Mishima Yukio Prize: Takahiro Ueda for 私の恋人
 Mystery Writers of Japan Award:
 Best Novel:
  for 
  for 
 Best Critical/Biographical Work:
 Masahiko Kikuni for 
 Aoi Shimotsuki for 
 Naoki Prize:
  for 流
  for つまをめとらば
 Nihon SF Taisho Award:
 Koronbia zero (Columbia Zero) by Kōshū Tani
 Toppen  by Hiroyuki Morioka 
 Noma Award for the Translation of Japanese Literature:  for Riku Onda's 
 Noma Literary Prize :  for 冥途あり
 Seiun Award:
 Best Japanese Novel:  by Taiyō Fujii
 Best Japanese Short Story:  by Hirotaka Tobi
 Sogen SF Short Story Prize:  for 神々の歩法
 Tanizaki Prize: Kaori Ekuni for ヤモリ、カエル、シジミチョウ
 Yamamoto Shūgorō Prize: Asako Yuzuki for ナイルパーチの女子会
 Yomiuri Prize:
Fiction:  for 女たち三百人の裏切りの書
Drama: Haruhiko Arai for この国の空

Best-sellers

Light novel titles
The following is a list of the 10 best-selling light novel titles in Japan during 2015 according to Oricon.

Light novel volumes
The following is a list of the 10 best-selling light novel volumes in Japan during 2015 according to Oricon.

Title debuts

February 28 - Isekai Shokudō by Junpei Inuzuka (story) and Katsumi Enami (art)
August 1 - Gangsta by Jun'ichi Kawabata
December 18 - Dagashi Kashi: Mō Hitotsu no Natsu Yasumi by Manta Aisora
December 25 - Violet Evergarden by Kana Akatsuki (story) and Akiko Takase (art)

Title endings

May 1 - Attack on Titan: Harsh Mistress of the City by Ryō Kawakami (story) and Range Murata (art)

References

Literature
Years of the 21st century in literature
Japanese literature by year
21st-century Japanese literature